Confidence Man are an Australian indie electro pop band formed in 2016 in Brisbane, Queensland. They released their debut album Confident Music for Confident People in April 2018. The front-duo and their band members have been a part of many festivals across Australia, most notably Splendour in the Grass and Falls Festival.

Background
The band was formed in 2016.  The members had met on the Brisbane music scene, and had been in other bands including: The Belligerents, Moses Gunn Collective and The Jungle Giants, and use pseudonyms in Confidence Man. They started writing dance songs together, initially as a "kind of joke", but eventually realised the material was worth pursuing.

Music
Planet and Bones provide vocals and dancing while Goodchild and McGuffie, who appear as masked figures, play keyboards and drums. The band signed to UK label Heavenly Records and released their debut UK single, "Bubblegum", in March 2017.

Confidence Man released their debut album, Confident Music for Confident People, on 13 April 2018. They toured Europe extensively in the middle of the same year, with festival slots and a sell-out at London's Scala before returning to Australia for dates in September.

The band released a Christmas single, "Santa's Coming Down the Chimney", in December 2018.

On 17 November 2019, Janet Planet and Sugar Bones were guests on Richard Kingsmill's '2019' programme on Triple J to premiere their new single "Does It Make You Feel Good?" During the interview, they revealed they have made celebrity friends with U2 and had been partying with them and Noel Gallagher while in Melbourne. They continued to explain their plans to feature The Edge playing tambourine on a future recording.

On 21 August 2020, Confidence Man released the single, "First Class Bitch."

On 10 November 2021, the band announce the forthcoming release of their second studio album, Tilt and released "Holiday" as its lead single.

Tilt was released on 1 April 2022 and peaked at number 7 on the ARIA charts.

In September 2022, the band released a remix EP, titled Re-Tilt, featuring remixes and reworkings of tracks from Tilt.

Discography

Albums

Extended plays

Singles

Notes

Awards and nominations

AIR Awards
The Australian Independent Record Awards (commonly known informally as AIR Awards) is an annual awards night to recognise, promote and celebrate the success of Australia's Independent Music sector.

|-
| AIR Awards of 2018
|"Bubblegum"
| Best Independent Dance/Electronic Club Song or EP
| 
|-
| rowspan="2"| AIR Awards of 2019
| themselves
| Best Breakthrough Act
| 
|-
| Confident Music for Confident People
| Best Independent Dance/Electronica Album
| 
|-
| AIR Awards of 2020
| "Does It Make You Feel Good?"
| Best Independent Dance or Electronica Single
| 
|-
| AIR Awards of 2022
| "Holiday"
| Best Independent Dance, Electronica or Club Single
|

ARIA Music Awards
The ARIA Music Awards is an annual awards ceremony that recognises excellence, innovation, and achievement across all genres of Australian music. They commenced in 1987. 

! 
|-
| rowspan="1"| 2022
| rowspan="1"| Tilt
| Best Dance/Electronic Release
| 
| 
|-

J Awards
The J Awards are an annual series of Australian music awards that were established by the Australian Broadcasting Corporation's youth-focused radio station Triple J. They commenced in 2005.

! 
|-
| 2017
| themselves
| Unearthed Artist of the Year
| 
| 
|-
| 2022
| "Holiday" by Confidence Man (directed by W.A.M. Bleakley)
| Australian Video of the Year
| 
|

Music Victoria Awards
The Music Victoria Awards are an annual awards night celebrating Victorian music. They commenced in 2006.

! 
|-
| 2022
| Confidence Man
| Best Pop Work
| 
| 
|-

National Live Music Awards
The National Live Music Awards (NLMAs) are a broad recognition of Australia's diverse live industry, celebrating the success of the Australian live scene. The awards commenced in 2016.

|-
| rowspan="3" |  2017
| rowspan="3" | Confidence Man
| Best New Act of the Year
| 
|-
| Live Pop Act of the Year
| 
|-
| Best Live Act of the Year - People's Choice
| 
|-
|  2018
| Confidence Man
| Live Pop Act of the Year
|

Queensland Music Awards
The Queensland Music Awards (previously known as Q Song Awards) are annual awards celebrating Queensland, Australia's brightest emerging artists and established legends. They commenced in 2006.
 
|-
| 2017
| "Boyfriend (Repeat)"
| Electronic Song of the Year
| 
|-
|2019
| themselves
| Export Achievement Award 
| 
|-

Performances and appearances

Headline tours
 The Boyfriend (repeat) Tour (2016)
 The Hard Candy Tour (2017)
 The Ring'A Ding Ding Tour (2017)
 Confident Music for Confident People World Tour (2018)
 Tilt Tour (2022)

Support tours
Chairlift - Australian support act

In popular culture
FIFA 19 - "Out the Window"
To All the Boys I've Loved Before
 Television commercial for iPhone XS, released 2018 - "Catch my Breath"

References

External links
 

Australian musicians
Musical groups from Brisbane
Musical groups established in 2016
Musicians from Brisbane
Living people
Year of birth missing (living people)
Heavenly Recordings artists
2016 establishments in Australia